A Hemingway special is an all day cocktail based on the Floridita daiquiri and is recognised by the IBA. It is made with rum, lime juice, maraschino liqueur, and grapefruit juice and served in a double cocktail glass.

History
Ernest Hemingway, who stayed in Cuba, tried the Floridita's signature drink, the Floridita daiquiri, and said "That's good but I prefer it without sugar and double rum," which became a cocktail now known as the Hemingway daiquiri or the Papa Doble. This recipe was later modified further, adding grapefruit juice to the mix, at which point the drink was dubbed the "Hemingway special".

See also
List of cocktails
IBA Official Cocktail

Bibliography

Cocktails with rum
Cocktails with lime juice
Cocktails with grapefruit juice
Cocktails with fruit liqueur